The Dictionary of Lost Words is the debut novel by Australian writer  Pip Williams. It was sixth on the list of Australian fiction bestsellers for 2020 and as of 18 January 2021 it had sold more than 100,000 copies.

Plot summary 
Esme's mother died giving her birth, so she is brought up by her father. She spends her childhood under the table in the Scriptorium, where James Murray and his team of lexicographers, including her father, are compiling the Oxford English Dictionary. Over time she discovers that words in common use, particularly those used by and about women, are not included.

Reception 
In reviewing the book for The Sydney Morning Herald, Jo Case says "In The Dictionary of Lost Words, Pip Williams combines the storytelling scale and intimate detail of a 19th-century novel with the sensibility of now – and a cast of richly realised characters and relationships that are a pleasure to spend time with". A write-up in the Kirkus Reviews said that "The result is a satisfying amalgam of truth and historical fiction". Other reviewers discussed the novel's elevation of language, with Book Reporter referring to it as "the novel [word lovers and linguists] have been waiting for without even realizing it" and Booklover Book Reviews saying it "reminds us of the power of words, to harm and control, but also to bridge gaps, to empower and to bring about change for the better".

Adaptations 
A stage adaption of the book will be produced by the State Theatre Company of South Australia and the Sydney Theatre Company in Adelaide and Sydney in September–October 2023.
It was announced in November 2022 that a collaboration between filmmakers Lisa Scott of Highview Productions and Rebecca Summerton of Closer Productions (who in 2019 collaborated on The Hunting) had bought the rights to adapt the book for a television series. Williams is co-executive producer, along with Alex Dimos and Andrew Nunn, while Anton Andreacchio is producer of the series.

Awards 

 Winner, MUD Literary Prize for best debut novel, 2021
 Winner, Book of the Year and Debut fiction award, Indie Book Awards, 2021
Shortlisted, Walter Scott Prize, 2021
Shortlisted, Christina Stead Prize for Fiction, NSW Premier's Literary Awards, 2021
Winner, People's Choice Award, NSW Premier's Literary Awards, 2021
Winner, General fiction book of the year, Australian Book Industry Awards, 2021

Formats 
In addition to being published in standard formats (paperback, ebook, audio book), a dyslexic edition is available.

References 

2020 Australian novels
2020 debut novels
Lexicographers